Lias may refer to:

Geology
 Lias Formation, a geologic formation in France
Lias Group, a lithostratigraphic unit in western Europe
 Early Jurassic, an epoch

People 
 Godfrey Lias, British author
 Mohd Shamsudin Lias (born 1953), Malaysian politician
 Lias Andersson (born 1998), Swedish hockey player

Other uses
 Lias (journal), title of the Journal of Early Modern Intellectual Culture and its Sources
 Lias, Gers, a commune of the Gers département in France
 LIAS (gene), a gene that in humans encodes the protein lipoic acid synthetase

See also 
 Lyas, a commune in southern France
 Lia (disambiguation)